Daniel Amobi Amadi Anyiam (November 26, 1926 – July 6, 1977) was a Nigerian football player and coach who was the national football coach of the country from 1954 to 1956 and again from 1964 to 1965. Prior to training as a coach, he was a player and was the first captain of the national team in 1949. He was also the first coach of the Enugu Rangers and was selector for the national team after the Nigerian Civil War.

A stadium in Owerri is named after him. He went to C.M.S. Central School, Nkwerre, Orlu, Etinan Institute, and Government Teacher's College, Calabar. He worked in the press offices of the West African Pilot briefly and then joined the staff of U.A.C. in Lagos where he also played football. He was U.A.C.'s captain when they won the 1950 Governor's Cup.

References

External links
Supereaglesnation.com
Daniel Anyiam

Nigerian footballers
Nigerian football managers
1926 births
Rangers International F.C. managers
1977 deaths
Association footballers not categorized by position